Planes is a genus of crabs in the family Grapsidae that currently comprises three extant species: Planes minutus (Linnaeus, 1758), Planes marinus Rathbun, 1914, and Planes major (=cyaneus) (MacLeay, 1838). A further fossil species is known from the Middle Miocene of the Caucasus.

References

Grapsidae
Extant Miocene first appearances